A Tiffany lamp is a type of lamp with a camed glass shade designed by Louis Comfort Tiffany or colleagues, and made (in originals) in his design studio.  The glass in the lampshades is put together with the copper-foil technique instead of leaded, the classic technique for stained-glass windows. Tiffany lamps are considered part of the Art Nouveau movement.  Considerable numbers of designs were produced from 1893 onwards. 

Due to Tiffany's dominant influence on the style, the term Tiffany lamp or Tiffany-style lamp has been often used to refer to stained-glass, leaded lamps, even those not made by Louis Comfort Tiffany's company.

History 
The first Tiffany lamp was exhibited in 1893, and is assumed to have been made in that year. Each lamp was handmade by skilled craftsmen, not mass- or machine-produced. Its designer was not, as had been thought for over 100 years, Louis Comfort Tiffany, but a previously unrecognized artist named Clara Driscoll, who was identified in 2007 by Rutgers professor Martin Eidelberg as being the master designer behind the most creative and valuable leaded-glass lamps produced by Tiffany Studios.

Tiffany's first business venture was an interior design firm in New York City, for which he designed stained-glass windows.

Tiffany lamps gained popularity after the Worlds Columbian Exposition in Chicago in 1893, where Tiffany displayed his lamps in a Byzantine-like chapel. His presentation caught the eye of many people, most notably Wilhelm Bode and Julius Lessing, directors of state museums in Berlin. Lessing purchased a few pieces to display in the Museum of Decorative Arts, making it the first European museum to own Tiffany glass. Though Tiffany's work was popular in Germany, other countries, such as France, were not as taken by it because of its relation to American crafts. Tiffany was only able to break into the French market by having the production of his works taken over by Siegfried Bing, with the assistance of many French artists. Without Bing’s access and contacts in Europe, Tiffany would not have had as much success selling his works to a European audience. Tiffany’s success throughout Europe was largely due to the success of his works in the German and Austro-Hungarian markets through a series of exhibitions beginning in 1897 at the International Art Exhibition in Dresden. After the partnership between Tiffany and Bing ended, interest in Tiffany products began to decline slowly in Europe.

Design

Most of Tiffany's lamps can be grouped into one of these categories:

 Irregular upper border
 Irregular lower border
 Favrile
 Geometric
 Transition to flowers
 Flowered cone
 Flowered globe

The irregular upper and lower border lamps carry an openwork crown edge that helps to simulate a branch, tree, or shrubbery. The Favrile category, which means handcrafted, identifies the first lamps Tiffany made with this label. His initials LCT, later replaced the Favrile stamp. The geometric category, done primarily by the male craftsman, speaks for itself. The Tiffany craftsman used geometric shapes such as triangles, squares, rectangles, and ovals to form the patterns for these lamps. Next is the transition to flowers group, which is subdivided into the flowered cone and globe lamps. All of these lamps follow a natural, or botanical, design using flowers, dragonflies, spiders with webs, butterflies, and peacock feathers. The difference within these two smaller categories is the difference in the lamp shapes, basically a cone and a globe.

Production 

Every lamp is prepared by using the copper-foil method. First, a pattern for the lamp is drawn out on a heavy piece of cardboard. Next, a number and glass color are written on the pattern piece. After the pattern is drawn and labeled, the glass is laid over it and traced. Once the pattern is traced onto the glass, the pieces can be cut and ground to their correct shape. Next, the pieces need to be cleaned so the copper foil can be applied to the edges. The copper-foil solution allows the pieces to adhere together. After the lamp has been placed accordingly and it is fully bonded, the edges are soldered together for a firm hold. Finally, after the lamp has been soldered, it is cleaned.

Collections 
 New-York Historical Society, Central Park West at West 77th Street – 132 lamps in the Dr. Egon Neustadt Collection of Tiffany Glass
 Queens Museum of Art, Flushing Meadows Corona Park, Queens, New York – the remainder of Neustadt's collection, which went to the museum after his death
 Virginia Museum of Fine Arts, Richmond, Virginia – 14 lamps on display in the Lewis Decorative Arts Galleries, with an additional four lamps in museum's collection, but not on display

Gallery

See also 
Tiffany glass

References

External links 

Light fixtures
Glass works of art
Art Nouveau works
Tiffany Studios